Isa bin Muhammad Al Khalifa (November 25, 1938 in Muharraq – August 13, 2015) was an Bahraini lawyer, judge, and minister. An uncle of King Hamad bin Isa Al Khalifa, Isa bin Muhammad directed the Al-Menber Islamic Society, the Bahraini branch of the Muslim Brotherhood, from 1963 until his death.

Career
Born in Muharraq, Al Khalifa graduated from Al-Hidaya Al-Khalifia Boys School in 1950, then obtained his high school diploma from Helwan Technical Vocational Secondary School in 1956. He earned a Bachelor of Arts in Law from Cairo University in 1962.

Death
Al Khalifa died after returning from medical treatment abroad on August 13, 2015, at the age of 77, and was buried on August 15, 2015 in Hunainiyah Cemetery in Riffa, Bahrain.

References

House of Khalifa
Bahraini lawyers
1938 births
2015 deaths